The 1995 Rugby League World Cup was held during October 1995 in the United Kingdom. It was the eleventh staging of the Rugby League World Cup and was marketed as the Halifax Centenary World Cup, reflecting the tournament's sponsorship and the fact that 1995 marked the centenary of the sport. Envisaged as a celebration of rugby league, the size of the competition was doubled, with four additional teams invited and England and Wales instead of Great Britain national rugby league team.

The tournament had been preceded by doubts and pessimism; many feared that it would produce one-sided-matches that would be unattractive to supporters. The forthcoming Super League war also hung over the tournament, with the Australian Rugby League refusing to select players who had signed for the rival competition.

Those fears proved unfounded, and the tournament was acclaimed a great success. Although some early matches did prove as one-sided as feared, fans still flocked to see newer rugby league nations such as Fiji, Tonga, Western Samoa and South Africa. Large home crowds for the group involving Wales proved particularly encouraging for the sport.

For the 1995 tournament, a £10,000 cup was made by Tiffanys to celebrate the centenary of the game.

The final between Australia and England drew a crowd of 66,540 to Wembley Stadium. Australia won the tournament, their eighth World Cup win and fifth in succession.

Teams 

Ten teams competed in the Centenary World Cup: Australia, England, Fiji, France, New Zealand, Papua New Guinea, South Africa, Tonga, Wales and Western Samoa. It was the first time since the 1975 World Series that England and Wales competed, rather than Great Britain. Fiji, South Africa, Tonga and Western Samoa all made their World Cup débuts. Scotland and Ireland took part in the Emerging Nations Tournament that was held alongside the World Cup.

Australia was missing some of their best players, a number of whom had been part of the 1994 Kangaroos squad, due to the Super League war and the ARL's refusal to select Super League-aligned players. Australia's win in the end, with what many considered to be a second-string side, was seen as a blow to the Super League organisation, with which every other nation was aligned.

Canberra Raiders players Laurie Daley, Ricky Stuart, Bradley Clyde, Steve Walters and Brett Mullins, won a court order against the ARL making Super League players eligible for representative games. Despite assurances from the ARL that all players were considered, only ARL loyal players were selected for the Kangaroos World Cup squad.

Venues 
The games were played at various venues in England and Wales.

Wembley Stadium in London was the host stadium for the opening ceremony and match featuring hosts England and defending champions Australia. Wembley, England's national stadium, would also host the Final of the tournament.

Matches

Group stage

Group A

Group B

Group C

Semi-finals 

England as expected defeated reigning European Champions Wales in their Semi-final at Old Trafford. The other Semi at Huddersfield almost produced a boil over. After defeating New Zealand 3–0 in the Trans-Tasman Test series earlier in the year, and with the Kiwis lackluster form in their Group B games, Australia was expected to easily account for Frank Endacott's side, but the Kiwis found form and the game ended 20–all at the end of 80 minutes (following a missed sideline conversion attempt by the Kiwis Matthew Ridge and a missed left foot drop goal attempt by the same player - both in the last few minutes of regular time). However, 20 minutes of extra time saw Australia skip away to a 30–20 win to book their place in the Final at Wembley.

Final 

The Australians had reached the final after a hard-fought 30–20 Semi-final win over New Zealand at the McAlpine Stadium which had gone into extra time after the score was locked at 20-all after 80 minutes. Their opponents and tournament host England, had an easier time defeating Wales 25–10 in their Semi at Old Trafford. Even though they were favoured to win, Australia went into the final having lost three of their past four games at Wembley (the only win being the World Cup final of 1992), and had already lost the opening match of the tournament there to the English. Also, due to the ARL's policy of not selecting Super League aligned players, the Kangaroos went into the game with 11 of their 17 players under the age of 24. Although considered mostly a 'second string' team without the likes of Laurie Daley, Ricky Stuart, Andrew Ettingshausen, Steve Renouf, Steve Walters and Glenn Lazarus, most of the Kangaroos had played in the 3–0 whitewash of New Zealand in the Trans-Tasman series earlier in the year. Kangaroos captain and five-eighth Brad Fittler and fullback Tim Brasher were the only members of Australia's 1992 World Cup Final win over Great Britain at Wembley, with both players in the same positions as they had been three years previously.

England's captain Shaun Edwards ruled himself out of the final with an infected knee. Despite almost being ruled out of the tournament with pneumonia, St Helens centre Paul Newlove was selected by coach Phil Larder for starting line-up in the final. Larder also handed the captaincy to veteran test forward Denis Betts. With the former Wigan back rower now playing for the Auckland Warriors in the Australian premiership, his selection as captain created history as he became the first player to captain England while not currently playing in the British competition.

After winning in 1992, Australian coach Bob Fulton became just the second coach (after Harry Bath) to win two Rugby League World Cups. It was Fulton's 5th World Cup win after also winning in 1968, 1970 and 1975 as a player. Coincidentally, Fulton's coach in the 1968 and 1970 World Cup Finals was Harry Bath.

Status Quo performed the pre-match entertainment, performing When You Walk in the Room and Rockin' All Over the World.

First half

England won the coin toss and Australia's Andrew Johns kicked off the match. In England's first set with the ball Australia were penalised for their skipper Brad Fittler's high tackle on Andrew Farrell. From the resulting good field position England were able to force a line drop-out and get another set of six in Australia's half of the field. At the end of the set, Radlinski put up a high kick, which Australia's fullback Tim Brasher failed to secure and Australia were penalised for regathering the ball when off-side. Bobbie Goulding kicked the penalty goal from fifteen metres out, giving his side a 2–0 lead. From Australia's resulting kick-off, the English players couldn't secure the ball and it was regathered by the Kangaroos deep in the opposition half. On the last tackle of the ensuing set, Johns at first receiver put a chip kick into the left-hand corner of England's in-goal area where winger Rod Wishart dived in and got a hand on it, giving Australia the first try of the match in the seventh minute. Johns then converted the try from the touch-line and the Kangaroos were leading 6–2. A few minutes later England were penalised around the centre of the field and Johns attempted the kick at goal but missed. With the game now swinging from end to end, Johns conceded a penalty close to the goal posts and Goulding's kick bounced off the uprights but went in, so England were trailing 6–4 by the eighteenth minute. A few minutes later England conceded a penalty in front of their goal posts and Johns kicked Australia to an 8–4 lead. Shortly after that England winger Martin Offiah made a break down along the left sideline and was contentiously ruled to have been taken over the sideline by a desperate Tim Brasher tackle as he threw the ball back into the field for Paul Newlove to toe ahead and dive on, though television replays suggested that Offiah had managed to release the ball before he went into touch. After a high shot from Andy Farrell on Mark Carroll, Johns kicked another penalty giving Australia a 10–4 lead at the 30-minute mark. Just before the half-time break England conceded another penalty in the ruck but Johns' kick missed so the score remained unchanged at the break.

Second half

After making their way into good attacking field position, England played the ball ten metres out from Australia's goal-line where centre Paul Newlove at dummy-half ran the ball at the defence forced his way through to score in the left corner. The sideline conversion attempt by Goulding missed so England trailed 10–8 after five minutes of the second half. Around the ten-minute mark the game was interrupted by a topless female streaker. The play continued swinging from one end of the field to the other, with neither team able to capitalise on their scoring opportunities for the next twenty minutes. Australian interchange player Jason Smith was blood binned and had to return to the bench. A few minutes later the Kangaroos had made their way deep into England's half when, on the last tackle, the ball was moved through the hands and eventually flicked passed back from Johns as he was being tackled to the feet of Brasher who kicked it ahead to the try-line. Both fullbacks then scrambled to get to the ball and the referee ruled that Brasher had grounded it, awarding Australia a try. Johns converted the try so Australia lead 16–8 with just over 10 minutes remaining. England forward Karl Harrison then had to come off the field with an injured arm. A few minutes from full-time Australian forward Mark Carroll was sent to the sin-bin for an infringement in the ruck. The remainder of the match extended into additional injury time but was played with no further points so Australia retained the World Cup with an 16–8 victory and their fifth consecutive world title.

21-year-old Andrew Johns was named man-of-the-match. Kangaroos coach Bob Fulton had named the young half as the team hooker, and he did indeed pack into the scrums. However Johns played at halfback in general play with Geoff Toovey having the dummy-half duties, necessary because Toovey had actually injured his neck during the tournament and simply could not pack into the front row in the scrums.

Following the match Prince Edward, Earl of Wessex presented Kangaroos captain Brad Fittler with the Cup and each of the players with medals. During the 1990 Kangaroo Tour, an 18-year-old Fittler had reportedly broken protocol when he had said "G'day dude" to Prince Edward's father, Prince Philip, Duke of Edinburgh when the team had met the Duke as part of the tour. History allegedly repeated itself as Fittler was heard to say "Thanks dude" to Prince Edward when receiving the World Cup on the Wembley balcony.

Team of the tournament 
The following players were selected as the 1995 World Cup "Team of the Tournament"

Try scorers 
6 tries
  Steve Menzies

5 tries

  Robbie O'Davis

4 tries

  Tim Brasher
  Paul Newlove
  Anthony Sullivan

3 tries

  Brett Dallas
  Terry Hill
  John Hopoate
  Jason Robinson
  Richie Blackmore
  Vila Matautia

2 tries

  Mark Coyne
  Andrew Johns
  Paul McGregor
  Danny Moore
  Paul Broadbent
  Simon Haughton
  Martin Offiah
  Nick Pinkney
  Kris Radlinski
  Tony Smith
  Fili Seru
  Waisale Sovatabua
  Sean Hoppe
  Tony Tatupu
  Va'aiga Tuigamala
  Awen Guttenbeil
  Una Taufa
  Willie Wolfgramm
  Iestyn Harris

1 try

  Jim Dymock
  Brad Fittler
  Nik Kosef
  Gary Larson
  Aaron Raper
  Jason Smith
  Rod Wishart
  John Bentley
  Denis Betts
  Phil Clarke
  Andrew Farrell
  Bobbie Goulding
  Chris Joynt
  Dean Sampson
  Joe Dakuitoga
  Samuela Marayawa
  Noa Nadruku
  Kalaveti Naisoro
  Ian Sagaitu
  Savenaca Taga
  Didier Cabestany
  Pierre Chamorin
  Patrick Torreilles
  Richie Barnett
  Kevin Iro
  Tony Iro
  Tony Kemp
  Hitro Okesene
  Matthew Ridge
  Marcus Bai
  David Buko
  Stanley Gene
  Adrian Lam
  Elias Paiyo
  Lucas Solbat
  Brian Laumatia
  Apollo Perelini
  Willie Swann
  Paki Tuimavave
  Gideon Watts
  Salesi Finau
  Phil Howlett
  Tau'alupe Liku
  Jimmy Veikoso
  John Devereux
  Kevin Ellis
  Rowland Phillips

References

External links 
 1995 World Cup audio highlights
 1995 World Cup Final at rlphotos.com
 1995 World Cup data at hunterlink.net.au
 1995 World Cup at rlif.com
 1995 World Cup at rlhalloffame.org.uk
 1995 World Cup at rugbyleagueproject.com
 1995 World Cup at 188-rugby-league.co.uk